The canton of Pithiviers is an administrative division of the Loiret department, central France. Its borders were modified at the French canton reorganisation which came into effect in March 2015. Its seat is in Pithiviers.

It consists of the following communes:
 
Andonville
Aschères-le-Marché
Attray
Audeville
Autruy-sur-Juine
Bazoches-les-Gallerandes
Boisseaux
Bougy-lez-Neuville
Césarville-Dossainville
Charmont-en-Beauce
Châtillon-le-Roi
Chaussy
Crottes-en-Pithiverais
Dadonville
Engenville
Erceville
Greneville-en-Beauce
Guigneville
Intville-la-Guétard
Jouy-en-Pithiverais
Léouville
Montigny
Morville-en-Beauce
Neuville-aux-Bois
Oison
Outarville
Pannecières
Pithiviers
Pithiviers-le-Vieil
Rouvres-Saint-Jean
Saint-Lyé-la-Forêt
Sermaises
Thignonville
Tivernon
Villereau

References

Cantons of Loiret